The Garrison Melmoth 2 is the second aircraft design from author Peter Garrison.

Development
The Melmoth 2 was started in August 1981 as a composite follow-on to the complex Melmoth homebuilt. Initial fuselage lay-up was performed by Garrison along with engineer Burt Rutan and future private astronaut Mike Melvill, who also performed a fair number of the test flights. The aircraft is a single engine four-seat retractable tricycle gear low-wing with a T-tail arrangement. The rear seats face aft. The engine is cooled using updraft air which enters through a single inlet below the spinner and emerges from the top of the cowling near the spinner. A single airbrake panel opens under the fuselage. The tapered wings are equipped with large Fowler flaps. The original design has been modified with 45-degree sweep winglets and gear doors.

Specifications (Melmoth 2)

See also

References

External links

Melmoth 2 Progress Updates
First Flight
Melmoth 2: A Personal Airplane by Peter Garrison in Flying Magazine

Homebuilt aircraft
Melmoth 2
Single-engined tractor aircraft
Low-wing aircraft
T-tail aircraft